Rossville is the name of the following towns:

Australia
 Rossville, Queensland, a town and locality in the Shire of Cook

Canada
 Rossville, Manitoba

United States
 Rossville, Georgia
 Rossville, Illinois
 Rossville, Indiana
 Rossville, Iowa
 Rossville, Kansas
 Rossville, Maryland
 Rossville, Missouri
 Rossville, Staten Island, New York, a neighborhood in New York City
 Rossville, Ohio, an unincorporated community
 Rossville, Knox County, Ohio, a ghost town
 Rossville, Tennessee